Bishopgate Green (also known as Bishopsgate Green) is a suburb of Coventry in the West Midlands, England. It is located on the Coventry Canal. It is an area between Foleshill and Hillfields and shares the area code CV1.

Suburbs of Coventry